The mayor of Genoa (Italian: sindaco di Genova) is an elected politician who, along with the Genoa City Council of 40 members, is accountable for the strategic government of the municipality of Genoa, Liguria, Italy.

The current office holder is Marco Bucci, an independent who has been in charge since 27 June 2017.

List of Mayors of Genoa

Kingdom of Piedmont-Sardinia (1848-1861)
In 1848 the Kingdom of Piedmont-Sardinia created the office of the Mayor of Genoa (Sindaco di Genova), chosen by Genoa citizens.

Kingdom of Italy (1861-1946)
In 1861 the Kingdom of Italy continued the previous office, chosen by the City council.
In 1926, the Fascist dictatorship abolished mayors and City councils, replacing them with an authoritarian Podestà chosen by the National Fascist Party.

Republic of Italy (1946-present)
From 1945 to 1993, the Mayor of Genoa was chosen by the City council.

Notes

Direct election (since 1993)
Since 1993, under provisions of new local administration law, the Mayor of Genoa is chosen by direct election, originally every four then every five years.

Timeline

Elections

Mayoral and City Council election, 1993
The election took place in two rounds: the first on 21 November, the second on 5 December 1993.

|- style="background-color:#E9E9E9;text-align:center;"
|- 
! colspan="4" rowspan="1" style="text-align:left;" | Parties and coalitions
! colspan="1" | Votes
! colspan="1" | %
! colspan="1" | Seats
|-
| style="background-color:pink" rowspan="6" |
| style="background-color:" |
| style="text-align:left;" | Democratic Party of the Left (Partito Democratico della Sinistra)
| PDS
| 98,026 || 26.19% || 22
|-
| style="background-color:" |
| style="text-align:left;" | Federation of the Greens (Federazione dei Verdi)
| FdV
| 13,227 || 3.55% || 3
|-
| style="background-color:" |
| style="text-align:left;" | Democratic Alliance (Alleanza Democratica)
| AD
| 12,255 || 3.27% || 2
|-
| style="background-color:" |
| style="text-align:left;" | Pannella List (Lista Pannella)
| LP
| 7,962 || 2.13% || 1
|-
| style="background-color:" |
| style="text-align:left;" | The Network (La Rete)
| LR 
| 6,558 || 1.75% || 1
|-
| style="background-color:" |
| style="text-align:left;" | Others 
| 
| 5,765 || 1.54% || 1
|- style="background-color:pink"
| style="text-align:left;" colspan="4" | Sansa coalition (Left-wing)
| 143,843 || 38.43% || 30
|-
| style="background-color:" |
| style="text-align:left;" colspan="2" | Lega Nord 
| LN
| 108,562 || 29.01% || 10
|-
| style="background-color:lightblue" rowspan="3" |
| style="background-color:" |
| style="text-align:left;" | Christian Democracy (Democrazia Cristiana)
| DC
| 33,604 || 8.98% || 4
|-
| style="background-color:" |
| style="text-align:left;" | Socialist Rebirth (Rinascita Socialista) 
| RS
| 14,840 || 3.96% || 1
|-
| style="background-color:" |
| style="text-align:left;" | Union of the Centre (Unione di Centro)
| UdC
| 6,975 || 1.86% || 0
|- style="background-color:lightblue"
| colspan="4" style="text-align:left;" | Signorini coalition (Centre)
| 55,419 || 14.81% || 5
|-
| style="background-color:" |
| style="text-align:left;" colspan="2" | Communist Refoundation Party (Rifondazione Comunista)
| PRC
| 32,238 || 8.61% || 3
|-
| style="background-color:" |
| style="text-align:left;" colspan="2" | Italian Social Movement (Movimento Sociale Italiano)
| MSI-DN
| 25,213 || 6.74% || 2
|-
| style="background-color:" |
| style="text-align:left;" colspan="2" | Others 
| 
| 9,004 || 2.41% || 0
|-
| colspan="7" style="background-color:#E9E9E9" | 
|- style="font-weight:bold;"
| style="text-align:left;" colspan="4" | Total
| 374,279 || 100% || 50
|-
| colspan="7" style="background-color:#E9E9E9" | 
|-
| style="text-align:left;" colspan="4" | Votes cast / turnout 
| 472,436 || 78.93% || style="background-color:#E9E9E9;" |
|-
| style="text-align:left;" colspan="4" | Registered voters
| 598,584 ||  || style="background-color:#E9E9E9;" |
|-
| colspan="7" style="background-color:#E9E9E9" | 
|-
| style="text-align:left;" colspan="7" | Source: Ministry of the Interior
|}

Mayoral and City Council election, 1997
The election took place on two rounds: the first on 16 November, the second on 30 November 1997.

|- 
|- style="background-color:#E9E9E9;text-align:center;"
! colspan="4" rowspan="1" style="text-align:left;" | Parties and coalitions
! colspan="1" | Votes
! colspan="1" | %
! colspan="1" | Seats
|-
| style="background-color:pink" rowspan="5" |
| style="background-color:" |
| style="text-align:left;" | Democratic Party of the Left (Partito Democratico della Sinistra)
| PDS
| 84,635 || 25.91% || 17
|-
| style="background-color:" |
| style="text-align:left;" | Communist Refoundation Party (Rifondazione Comunista)
| PRC
| 31,093 || 9.52% || 6
|-
| style="background-color:pink" |
| style="text-align:left;" | Italian People's Party (Partito Popolare Italiano)
| PPI
| 19,965 || 6.11% || 4
|-
| style="background-color:" |
| style="text-align:left;" | Italian Renewal (Rinnovamento Italiano)
| RI
| 6,223 || 1.91% || 1
|-
| style="background-color:" |
| style="text-align:left;" | Others 
| 
| 10,018 || 3.06% || 2
|- style="background-color:pink"
| style="text-align:left;" colspan="4" | Pericu coalition (Centre-left)
| 151,934 || 46.51% || 30
|-
| style="background-color:lightblue" rowspan="3" |
| style="background-color:" |
| style="text-align:left;" | Forza Italia 
| FI
| 42,170 || 12.91% || 6
|-
| style="background-color:"|
| style="text-align:left;" | National Alliance (Alleanza Nazionale)
| AN
| 18,265 || 5.59% || 2
|-
| style="background-color:" |
| style="text-align:left;" | Christian Democratic Centre (Centro Cristiano Democratico)
| CCD
| 7,524 || 2.30% || 0
|- style="background-color:lightblue"
| colspan="4" style="text-align:left;" | Eva coalition (Centre-right)
|  67,959 || 20.80% || 8
|-
| style="background-color:darkblue" |
| style="text-align:left;" colspan="2" | New Genoa (Genova Nuova)
| GN
| 55,947 || 17.13% || 7
|-
| style="background-color:orange" |
| style="text-align:left;" colspan="2" | Sansa for Genoa (Sansa per Genova)
| SpG
| 36,186 || 11.08% || 4
|-
| style="background-color:" |
| style="text-align:left;" colspan="2" | Lega Nord
| LN
| 11,481 || 3.51% || 1
|-
| style="background-color:" |
| style="text-align:left;" colspan="2" | Others 
| 
|  3,155 || 0.97% || 0
|-
| colspan="7" style="background-color:#E9E9E9" | 
|- style="font-weight:bold;"
| style="text-align:left;" colspan="4" | Total
| 326,662 || 100.00% || 50
|-
| colspan="7" style="background-color:#E9E9E9" | 
|-
| style="text-align:left;" colspan="4" | Votes cast / turnout 
| 400,823 || 69.88% || style="background-color:#E9E9E9;" |
|-
| style="text-align:left;" colspan="4" | Registered voters
| 573,607 ||  || style="background-color:#E9E9E9;" |
|-
| colspan="7" style="background-color:#E9E9E9" | 
|-
| style="text-align:left;" colspan="7" | Source: Ministry of the Interior
|}

Notes

Mayoral and City Council election, 2002
The election took place on 26 May 2002.

|- 
|- style="background-color:#E9E9E9;text-align:center;"
! colspan="4" rowspan="1" style="text-align:left;" | Parties and coalitions
! colspan="1" | Votes
! colspan="1" | %
! colspan="1" | Seats
|-
| style="background-color:pink" rowspan="6" |
| style="background-color:" |
| style="text-align:left;" | Democrats of the Left (Democratici di Sinistra)
| DS
| 102,944 || 35.19% || 20
|-
| style="background-color:" |
| style="text-align:left;" | The Daisy (La Margherita)
| DL
| 27,166 || 9.29% || 5
|-
| style="background-color:" |
| style="text-align:left;" | Communist Refoundation Party (Rifondazione Comunista)
| PRC
| 21,369 || 7.30% || 4
|-
| style="background-color:" |
| style="text-align:left;" | Federation of the Greens (Federazione dei Verdi)
| FdV
| 6,399 || 2.19% || 1
|-
| style="background-color:" |
| style="text-align:left;" | Party of Italian Communists (Comunisti Italiani)
| PdCI
| 5,176 || 1.77% || 1
|-
| style="background-color:" |
| style="text-align:left;" | Others 
| 
| 9,691 || 3.32% || 0
|- style="background-color:pink"
| style="text-align:left;" colspan="4" | Pericu coalition (Centre-left)
| 172,745 || 59.05% || 31
|-
| style="background-color:lightblue" rowspan="3" |
| style="background-color:" |
| style="text-align:left;" | Forza Italia 
| FI
| 49,609 || 16.96% || 9
|-
| style="background-color:"|
| style="text-align:left;" | National Alliance (Alleanza Nazionale)
| AN
| 17,121 || 5.85% || 3
|-
| style="background-color:" |
| style="text-align:left;" | Union of the Centre (Unione di Centro)
| UDC
| 6,867 || 2.35% || 1
|- style="background-color:lightblue"
| colspan="4" style="text-align:left;" | Magnani coalition (Centre-right)
| 73,597  || 25.16% || 13
|-
| style="background-color:#A3C1AD" rowspan="2" |
| style="background-color:darkblue" |
| style="text-align:left;" | New Genoa (Genova Nuova)
| GN
| 23,198 || 7.93% || 5
|-
| style="background-color:" |
| style="text-align:left;" | Lega Nord 
| LN
| 9,405 || 3.22% || 1
|- style="background-color:#A3C1AD"
| colspan="4" style="text-align:left;" | Castellaneta coalition
| 32,603 || 11.15% || 6
|-
| style="background-color:" |
| style="text-align:left;" colspan="2" | Others 
| 
| 13,585 || 4.64% || 0
|-
| colspan="7" style="background-color:#E9E9E9" | 
|- style="font-weight:bold;"
| style="text-align:left;" colspan="4" | Total
| 292,530 || 100.00% || 50
|-
| colspan="7" style="background-color:#E9E9E9" | 
|-
| style="text-align:left;" colspan="4" | Votes cast / turnout 
| 367,746 || 67.25% || style="background-color:#E9E9E9;" |
|-
| style="text-align:left;" colspan="4" | Registered voters
| 546,834 ||  || style="background-color:#E9E9E9;" |
|-
| colspan="7" style="background-color:#E9E9E9" | 
|-
| style="text-align:left;" colspan="7" | Source: Ministry of the Interior
|}

Mayoral and City Council election, 2007
The election took place on 27–28 May 2007.

|- 
|- style="background-color:#E9E9E9;text-align:center;"
! colspan="4" rowspan="1" style="text-align:left;" | Parties and coalitions
! colspan="1" | Votes
! colspan="1" | %
! colspan="1" | Seats
|-
| style="background-color:pink" rowspan="6" |
| style="background-color:" |
| style="text-align:left;" | The Olive Tree (L'Ulivo)
| 
| 89,337 || 34.60% || 22
|-
| style="background-color:" |
| style="text-align:left;" | Communist Refoundation Party (Rifondazione Comunista)
| PRC
| 15,615 || 6.05% || 3
|-
| style="background-color:" |
| style="text-align:left;" | Italy of Values (Italia dei Valori)
| IdV
| 9,296 || 3.60% || 2
|-
| style="background-color:" |
| style="text-align:left;" | Party of Italian Communists (Comunisti Italiani)
| PdCI
| 6,447 || 2.50% || 1
|-
| style="background-color:" |
| style="text-align:left;" | Federation of the Greens (Federazione dei Verdi)
| FdV
| 5,768 || 2.23% || 1
|-
| style="background-color:" |
| style="text-align:left;" | Others 
| 
| 11,272 || 4.36% || 1
|- style="background-color:pink"
| style="text-align:left;" colspan="4" | Vincenzi coalition (Centre-left)
| 137,735 || 53.34% || 30
|-
| style="background-color:lightblue" rowspan="6" |
| style="background-color:" |
| style="text-align:left;" | Forza Italia 
| FI
| 58,396 || 22.61% || 12
|-
| style="background-color:blue" |
| style="text-align:left;" | Biasotti List (Lista Biasotti)
| LB
| 18,724 || 7.25% || 3
|-
| style="background-color:"|
| style="text-align:left;" | National Alliance (Alleanza Nazionale)
| AN
| 16,117 || 6.24% || 3
|-
| style="background-color:"|
| style="text-align:left;" | Lega Nord
| LN
| 9,340 || 3.62% || 1
|-
| style="background-color:" |
| style="text-align:left;" | Union of the Centre (Unione di Centro)
| UDC
| 8,170 || 3.16% || 1
|-
| style="background-color:"|
| style="text-align:left;" | Pensioners' Party (Partito Pensionati)
| PP
| 1,932 || 0.75% || 0
|-
|- style="background-color:lightblue"
| colspan="4" style="text-align:left;" | Musso coalition (Centre-right)
| 112,679  || 43.64% || 20
|-
| style="background-color:" |
| style="text-align:left;" colspan="2" | Others 
| 
| 7,813 || 3.02% || 0
|-
| colspan="7" style="background-color:#E9E9E9" | 
|- style="font-weight:bold;"
| style="text-align:left;" colspan="4" | Total
| 258,227 || 100.00% || 50
|-
| colspan="7" style="background-color:#E9E9E9" | 
|-
| style="text-align:left;" colspan="4" | Votes cast / turnout 
| 328,289 || 61.75% || style="background-color:#E9E9E9;" |
|-
| style="text-align:left;" colspan="4" | Registered voters
| 523,529 ||  || style="background-color:#E9E9E9;" |
|-
| colspan="7" style="background-color:#E9E9E9" | 
|-
| style="text-align:left;" colspan="7" | Source: Ministry of the Interior
|}

Mayoral and City Council election, 2012
The election took place on two rounds: the first on 6–7 May, the second on 20–21 May 2012.

|- 
|- style="background-color:#E9E9E9;text-align:center;"
! colspan="4" rowspan="1" style="text-align:left;" | Parties and coalitions
! colspan="1" | Votes
! colspan="1" | %
! colspan="1" | Seats
|-
| style="background-color:pink" rowspan="6" |
| style="background-color:" |
| style="text-align:left;" | Democratic Party (Partito Democratico)
| PD
| 55,137 || 23.89% || 12
|-
| style="background-color:darkorange" |
| style="text-align:left;" | Doria List (Lista Doria)
| LD
| 26,784 || 11.60% || 6
|-
| style="background-color:" |
| style="text-align:left;" | Italy of Values (Italia dei Valori)
| IdV
| 13,730 || 5.95% || 3
|-
| style="background-color:" |
| style="text-align:left;" | Left Ecology Freedom (Sinistra Ecologia Libertà)
| SEL
| 11,606 || 5.03% || 2
|-
| style="background-color:" |
| style="text-align:left;" | Federation of the Left (Federazione della Sinistra)
| FdS
| 5,274 || 2.28% || 1
|-
| style="background-color:" |
| style="text-align:left;" | Others 
| 
| 4,723 || 2.04% || 0
|- style="background-color:pink"
| style="text-align:left;" colspan="4" | Doria coalition (Centre-left)
| 117,254 || 50.80% || 24
|-
| style="background-color:" |
| style="text-align:left;" colspan="2" | Five Star Movement (Movimento Cinque Stelle)
| M5S
| 32,516 || 14.09% || 5
|-
| style="background-color:lightblue" rowspan="2" |
| style="background-color:" |
| style="text-align:left;" | The People of Freedom (Il Popolo della Libertà) 
| PdL
| 21,251 || 9.21% || 5
|-
| style="background-color:" |
| style="text-align:left;" | Others 
| 
| 8,655 || 3.75% || 0
|- style="background-color:lightblue"
| colspan="4" style="text-align:left;" | Vinai coalition (Centre-right)
|  29,906 || 12.96% || 5
|-
| style="background-color:blue" |
| style="text-align:left;" colspan="2" | Musso List (Lista Musso)
| LM
| 28,818 || 12.49% || 5
|-
| style="background-color:" |
| style="text-align:left;" colspan="2" | Lega Nord
| LN
| 10,042 || 4.35% || 1
|-
| style="background-color:" |
| style="text-align:left;" colspan="2" | Others 
| 
| 12,274 || 5.31% || 0
|-
| colspan="7" style="background-color:#E9E9E9" | 
|- style="font-weight:bold;"
| style="text-align:left;" colspan="4" | Total
| 230,810 || 100.00% || 40
|-
| colspan="7" style="background-color:#E9E9E9" | 
|-
| style="text-align:left;" colspan="4" | Votes cast / turnout 
| 279,683 || 55.52% || style="background-color:#E9E9E9;" |
|-
| style="text-align:left;" colspan="4" | Registered voters
| 503,752 ||  || style="background-color:#E9E9E9;" |
|-
| colspan="7" style="background-color:#E9E9E9" | 
|-
| style="text-align:left;" colspan="7" | Source: Ministry of the Interior
|}

Mayoral and City Council election, 2017
The election took place on two rounds: the first on 11 June, the second on 25 June 2017.

|- 
|- style="background-color:#E9E9E9;text-align:center;"
! colspan="4" rowspan="1" style="text-align:left;" | Parties and coalitions
! colspan="1" | Votes
! colspan="1" | %
! colspan="1" | Seats
|-
| style="background-color:lightblue" rowspan="5" |
| style="background-color:" |
| style="text-align:left;" | Lega Nord 
| LN
| 28,194 || 12.96% || 9
|-
| style="background-color:darkorange" |
| style="text-align:left;" | Genoa Wins (Vince Genova)
| VG
| 21,243 || 9.76% || 6
|-
| style="background-color:" |
| style="text-align:left;" | Forza Italia 
| FI
| 17,582 || 8.08% || 5
|-
| style="background-color:" |
| style="text-align:left;" | Brothers of Italy (Fratelli d'Italia) 
| FdI
| 11,490 || 5.28% || 3
|-
| style="background-color:" |
| style="text-align:left;" | Direction Italy (Direzione Italia) 
| DI
| 4,638 || 2.13% || 1
|- style="background-color:lightblue"
| colspan="4" style="text-align:left;" | Bucci coalition (Centre-right)
|  83,147 || 38.22% || 24
|-
| style="background-color:pink" rowspan="4" |
| style="background-color:" |
| style="text-align:left;" | Democratic Party (Partito Democratico)
| PD
| 43,156 || 19.84% || 7
|-
| style="background-color:orange" |
| style="text-align:left;" | Crivello List (Lista Crivello)
| LC
| 20,601 || 9.47% || 3
|-
| style="background-color:" |
| style="text-align:left;" | To Left (A Sinistra)
| SI
| 6,598 || 3.03% || 0
|-
| style="background-color:" |
| style="text-align:left;" | Others 
| 
| 6,933 || 3.19% || 0
|- style="background-color:pink"
| style="text-align:left;" colspan="4" | Crivello coalition (Centre-left)
| 77,288 || 35.52% || 10
|-
| style="background-color:" |
| style="text-align:left;" colspan="2" | Five Star Movement (Movimento Cinque Stelle)
| M5S
| 39,971 || 18.37% || 5
|-
| style="background-color:blue" |
| style="text-align:left;" colspan="2" | Call Me Genoa (Chiamami Genova)
| CG
| 10,633 || 4.89% || 1
|-
| style="background-color:" |
| style="text-align:left;" colspan="2" | Others 
| 
| 6,523 || 2.99% || 0
|-
| colspan="7" style="background-color:#E9E9E9" | 
|- style="font-weight:bold;"
| style="text-align:left;" colspan="4" | Total
| 217,562 || 100.00% || 40
|-
| colspan="7" style="background-color:#E9E9E9" | 
|-
| style="text-align:left;" colspan="4" | Votes cast / turnout 
| 237,679 || 48.39% || style="background-color:#E9E9E9;" |
|-
| style="text-align:left;" colspan="4" | Registered voters
| 491,167 ||  || style="background-color:#E9E9E9;" |
|-
| colspan="7" style="background-color:#E9E9E9" | 
|-
| style="text-align:left;" colspan="7" | Source: Ministry of the Interior
|}

Mayoral and City Council election, 2022
The election took place on 12 June 2022.

|- 
|- style="background-color:#E9E9E9;text-align:center;"
! colspan="4" rowspan="1" style="text-align:left;" | Parties and coalitions
! colspan="1" | Votes
! colspan="1" | %
! colspan="1" | Seats
|-
| style="background-color:lightblue" rowspan="8" |
| style="background-color:darkorange" |
| style="text-align:left;" | Bucci List (Lista Bucci)
| LB
| 36,335 || 19.06% || 9
|-
| style="background-color:" |
| style="text-align:left;" | Brothers of Italy (Fratelli d'Italia)
| FdI
| 17,788 || 9.33% || 4
|-
| style="background-color:" |
| style="text-align:left;" | Let's Change! (Cambiamo!)
| C!
| 17,485 || 9.17% || 4
|-
| style="background-color:" |
| style="text-align:left;" | Lega 
| L
| 12,886 || 6.76% || 3
|-
| style="background-color:lightblue" |
| style="text-align:left;" | Genoa Tomorrow (Genova Domani)
| GD
| 8,952 || 4.70% || 2
|-
| style="background-color:" |
| style="text-align:left;" | Forza Italia 
| FI
| 7,340 || 3.85% || 1
|-
| style="background-color:" |
| style="text-align:left;" | Union of the Centre (Unione di Centro)
| UDC
| 3,752 || 1.97% || 1
|-
| style="background-color:" |
| style="text-align:left;" | Others 
| 
| 656 || 0.35% || 0
|- style="background-color:lightblue"
| style="text-align:left;" colspan="4" | Bucci coalition (Centre-right)
| 105,194 || 55.19% || 24
|-
| style="background-color:pink" rowspan="5" |
| style="background-color:" |
| style="text-align:left;" | Democratic Party (Partito Democratico)
| PD
| 39,937 || 20.95% || 10
|-
| style="background-color:purple"  |
| style="text-align:left;" | Dello Strologo List (Lista Dello Strologo)
| LDS
| 12,032 || 6.31% || 2
|-
| style="background-color:" |
| style="text-align:left;" | Green Europe (Europe Verde)
| EV
| 9,873 || 5.18% || 2
|-
| style="background-color:" |
| style="text-align:left;" | Five Star Movement (Movimento Cinque Stelle)
| M5S
| 8,381 || 4.40% || 1
|-
| style="background-color:" |
| style="text-align:left;" | Italian Left (Sinistra Italiana)
| SI
| 2,930 || 1.54% || 0
|- style="background-color:pink"
| colspan="4" style="text-align:left;" | Dello Strologo coalition (Centre-left)
| 73,153 || 38.38% || 15
|-
| style="background-color:brown" |
| style="text-align:left;" colspan="2"| United for the Constitution (Uniti per la Costituzione)
| UpC
| 6,771 || 3.55% || 1
|-
| style="background-color:" |
| style="text-align:left;"  colspan="2" | Others 
| 
| 5,480 || 2.87% || 0
|-
| colspan="7" style="background-color:#E9E9E9" | 
|- style="font-weight:bold;"
| style="text-align:left;" colspan="4" | Total
| 190,600 || 100% || 40
|-
| colspan="7" style="background-color:#E9E9E9" | 
|-
| style="text-align:left;" colspan="4" | Votes cast / turnout 
| 212,199 || 44.17% || style="background-color:#E9E9E9;" |
|-
| style="text-align:left;" colspan="4" | Registered voters
| 480,424 ||  || style="background-color:#E9E9E9;" |
|-
| colspan="7" style="background-color:#E9E9E9" | 
|-
| style="text-align:left;" colspan="7" | Source: Ministry of the Interior
|}

See also
 Timeline of Genoa

Notes

References 
This article originated as a translation of this version of its counterpart in the Italian Wikipedia.

Mayors
Genoa